Stegophora is a genus of fungi in the family Sydowiellaceae.

References

External links 

 Stegophora at Index Fungorum

Diaporthales